Balsam Creek may refer to:

Balsam Creek (Prairie River), a river in Minnesota
Balsam Creek, Ontario, a community